Florence Wood Hanby (April 18, 1870 – February 22, 1963) was a politician representing New Castle County, Delaware, United States.

Hanby was the first woman elected to the Delaware General Assembly, winning a seat in the Delaware House of Representatives in 1924.

Career
Hanby was a Republican representing Brandywine Hundred in New Castle County.

Hanby was greeted cordially by her fellow assembly members.  Upon arriving at the State House in January 1925, two floral bouquets were on her desk, to which she remarked, "it looks like a second wedding".

While in office, Hanby advocated to help victims of tuberculosis, and introduced the "Hope Farm Bill" to provide funding for an anti-tuberculosis hospital at Hope Farm, near Marshallton.

Sources

1870 births
1963 deaths
Republican Party members of the Delaware House of Representatives
Women state legislators in Delaware
Place of birth missing